Luzern Verkehrshaus railway station is a railway station in the city of Lucerne, in the Swiss canton of Lucerne. It is an intermediate stop on the standard gauge Lucerne–Immensee line of Swiss Federal Railways. The station is directly adjacent to the Swiss Museum of Transport. Connections to the Lake Lucerne Navigation Company's ferries on Lake Lucerne are available at the Verkehrshaus-Lido landing stage on the other side of the museum from the station.

The station was opened in 2007. Previously a service station "Würzenbach" was located there.

Services 
 the following services stop at Luzern Verkehrshaus:

  Voralpen-Express: hourly service between Lucerne and St. Gallen.
 Lucerne S-Bahn : hourly service between Lucerne and Brunnen.

References

External links 
 
 

Railway stations in the canton of Lucerne
Swiss Federal Railways stations
Buildings and structures in Lucerne
Transport in Lucerne
Railway stations in Switzerland opened in 2007